Delta High School is a high school in Delta, Utah, United States.

Athletics
Delta High is known for its mascot, the Rabbit, and for its state record of 34 state wrestling championships. Its colors are red and white. It competes in 3A, Region 15. The Delta Palladium on the Delta High campus is a well-known high school gymnasium in Utah. The student section was nicknamed "The Rabbit Pack" in 2015. Delta High School enjoys a heated rivalry with the neighboring Millard High School of Fillmore, Utah.

State championships by sport
 Wrestling - 34
 Football - 9
 Volleyball - 8
 Boys' track - 7
 Boys' golf - 3
 Boys' water polo - 1
 Boys' basketball - 1
 Girls' basketball - 3
 Girls' track - 1
 Softball - 1

State championships by year
 1929-30 = boys' basketball (Hinckley High)
 1938-39 = football
 1952-53 = track
 1954-55 = Wrestling
 1955-56 = wrestling
 1960-61 = wrestling
 1962-63 = wrestling
 1963-64 = wrestling
 1964-65 = wrestling
 1965-66 = wrestling
 1966-67 = football, wrestling
 1968-69 = football
 1971-72 = boys' basketball
 1972-73 = track
 1973-74 = track, wrestling
 1974-75 = wrestling
 1975-76 = football, track, wrestling
 1976-77 = track, wrestling
 1977-78 = wrestling
 1978-79 = wrestling
 1979-80 = wrestling
 1980-81 = wrestling
 1981-82 = volleyball
 1982-83 = volleyball
 1984-85 = volleyball, wrestling
 1985-86 = football, volleyball, wrestling
 1986-87 = football, girls' basketball, volleyball, wrestling
 1987-88 = wrestling
 1988-89 = wrestling
 1989-90 = volleyball, wrestling
 1990-91 = wrestling
 1991-92 = football, wrestling
 1992-93 = softball, track, volleyball, wrestling
 1995-96 = football, girls' track, volleyball
 1996-97 = track
 1998-99 = boys' water polo
 1999-00 = boys' golf
 2000-01 = boys' golf
 2001-02 = boys' golf, football, wrestling
 2008-09 = wrestling
 2009-10 = wrestling
 2010-11 = wrestling
 2011-12 = wrestling
 2012-13 = wrestling
 2013-14 = girls' golf, wrestling
 2014-15 = girls' basketball, wrestling
 2015-16 = girls' basketball, volleyball
 2021-22 = marching band

Wrestling
Delta is well-known for its wrestling program and is ranked second in the nation for state championships.

See also

 List of high schools in Utah

References

External links

 Delta High website

Schools in Millard County, Utah
Public high schools in Utah